Sosthène Soglo (born 3 July 1986) is a Beninese football player who currently plays in Benin for Energie Sports FC.

International career
He presented the Benin national football team at 2007 UEMOA Tournament in Burkina Faso.
Soglo played his debut for the Benin on 21 August 2007 in a Friendly match against Gabon in France and played his second game in the Qualification for the 2008 Africa Cup of Nations.

References

1986 births
Living people
Beninese footballers
Benin international footballers
People from Cotonou
Requins de l'Atlantique FC players
Association football midfielders